Kabaddi at the 2018 Asian Games was held at the Garuda Theatre, Taman Mini Indonesia Indah, Jakarta, Indonesia, from 19 to 24 August 2018.

Schedule

Medalists

Medal table

Draw
A draw ceremony was held on 17 August 2018 to determine the groups for the men's and women's competitions. The teams were seeded based on their final ranking at the 2014 Asian Games.

Men

Group A
 (1)
 (3)

Group B
 (2)
 (3)

Women

Group A
 (1)
 (3)

Group B
 (2)
 (3)

Final standing

Men

Women

References

External links
Kabaddi at the 2018 Asian Games
Official Result Book – Kabaddi

 
2018
2018 Asian Games events
Asian Games
2018 Asian Games